Edson Jesus Silva (born 10 September 1992 in Luanda) is an Angola footballer who plays for Interclube as a centre back or midfielder.

In 2019, he transferred from Sagrada Esperança to Interclube in midseason.

External links

References

1992 births
Living people
Footballers from Luanda
Angolan footballers
Portuguese footballers
Angolan emigrants to Portugal
Naturalised citizens of Portugal
Association football defenders
Association football midfielders
Cypriot First Division players
Enosis Neon Paralimni FC players
G.D. Interclube players
G.D. Sagrada Esperança players